The 2006–07 Quaid-e-Azam Trophy was one of three first-class domestic cricket competitions that were held in Pakistan during the 2006–07 season. The Quaid-e-Azam Trophy was contested by thirteen teams representing regional associations; it was preceded in the schedule by the Patron's Trophy (Grade-I), contested by nine departmental teams, and followed later in the season by the Pentangular Cup, which unlike the previous year did not involve teams from the Quaid-e-Azam Trophy.

There was no change to the structure of the competition from the previous season, with seven teams in the Gold League and six teams in the Silver League. Each league was played in a round-robin of four-day matches beginning on 6 January 2007, with a final played over five days between the top two teams to determine the winner. The winner of the Gold League final received the Quaid-e-Azam Trophy; the winner of the Silver League final would have gained promotion to the Gold league, with the last placed team in the Gold League being relegated to the Silver League, but the Pakistan Cricket Board reorganised the regional associations and departments into a single competition for the following season.

Karachi Urban lifted the Quaid-e-Azam Trophy, the eighteenth victory by a Karachi team, after they beat defending champions Sialkot by eight wickets in the Gold League final. Multan won the Silver League final in a replay, after the weather-affected first match ended in a draw with no result on first innings.

Group stage
The top two teams in the round-robin group stage (highlighted) advanced to the finals.

Finals

Gold League final

Silver League final (replay)

Notes

References

External links
 Series home at ESPN Cricinfo

Domestic cricket competitions in 2006–07
2007 in Pakistani cricket
Pakistani cricket seasons from 2000–01
2006–07 Quaid-e-Azam Trophy